The Bazar Caves otherwise Bāzār Caves are located in the Khyber in the mountainous Federally Administered Tribal Areas of Pakistan.

Sources and external links
 Detailed map of Bazar Caves and environs
 3D map
 Pakistan Cave Research Association

Caves of Pakistan
Landforms of Khyber Pakhtunkhwa